San Pablo Bay National Wildlife Refuge is a  National Wildlife Refuge in California established in 1970. It extends along the northern shore of San Pablo Bay, from the mouth of the Petaluma River, to Tolay Creek, Sonoma Creek, and ending at Mare Island.

Ecology

The refuge encompasses the largest remaining continuous patch of pickleweed-dominated tidal marsh in the northern San Francisco Bay.

Historically, the wetlands surrounding San Pablo Bay were one of the largest tidal marsh complexes on the Pacific Coast of North America. However, the area has been significantly impacted by human activities such as hydraulic mining, salt production, diking, draining, filling, agriculture, and development. All told, about 85% of San Pablo Bay's tidal marshes have been altered. In fact, damaged portions these marsh areas and along the Petaluma River were considered as sites for artificial marsh creation using dredged materials. This effort was part of a US Army Corps of Engineers, Waterways Experiment Station study conducted by a Consultant from CZRC, Wilmington, NC, Dr. John C. Nemeth in the mid-1970s.

The Refuge includes a variety of habitats including open water, mud flat, tidal marsh, estuary, and seasonal and managed wetlands.

The refuge hosts millions of migratory shorebirds and waterfowl, including the largest wintering population of Canvasbacks on the west coast. The Refuge also provides year-round habitat for sensitive species including the endangered Ridgway's Rail and  salt marsh harvest mouse. Public access to the refuge is provided by the Tolay Creek Tubbs Island Trail.

References

Bibliography

U.S. Fish and Wildlife Service: San Pablo Bay National Wildlife Refuge
Friends of the San Pablo Bay National Wildlife Refuge

External links
 Highway to the Flyway:The Road to Restoration on San Pablo Bay from Bay Nature magazine, July–September 2007 issue. Provides a brief history of the marshes of San Pablo Bay.

National Wildlife Refuges in California
San Pablo Bay
Parks in the San Francisco Bay Area
Estuaries of California
Wetlands of the San Francisco Bay Area
Protected areas of Napa County, California
Protected areas of Solano County, California
Protected areas of Sonoma County, California
Natural history of Napa County, California
Natural history of Solano County, California
Natural history of Sonoma County, California
IUCN Category IV